Estadio Municipal de Rancagua, also known as Estadio Municipal Patricio Mekis, is a multi-purpose stadium in Rancagua, Chile. The stadium hosted three matches of the Rancagua between O'Higgins and Enfoque.

Rancagua derby

Matches

References

Football venues in Chile
Sports venues in O'Higgins Region
Multi-purpose stadiums in Chile
Rancagua